The Hallstatt plateau is a term used in archaeology that refers to a consistently flat area on graphs that plot radiocarbon dating against calendar dates.  Radiocarbon dates of around 2450 BP (Before Present) always calibrate to c. 800–400 BC, no matter the measurement precision.  The carbon 14 dating method is hampered by this large plateau on the calibration curve in a critical period of human technological development. Just before and after the plateau, calibration is accurate; during the plateau only techniques like wiggle matching can yield useful calendar dates. The plateau is named after the Hallstatt culture period in central Europe with which it coincides.

Wiggle matching
Wiggle matching involves taking a series of radiocarbon dates where the prior knowledge about the true calendar dates of the samples can be expressed as known differences in age between those samples, or occasionally as differences in age with some small uncertainty. The series of radiocarbon dates can then be matched to the calibration curve to provide a relatively precise estimate of age. When the results are plotted on a graph the 'wiggles' in the sample sequence of radiocarbon dates match the 'wiggles' in the calibration curve - hence the name.

Effect of the plateau
Some archaeologists and chronologists refer to the Hallstatt plateau as the "1st millennium BC radiocarbon disaster".  Peter James cites Mike Baillie (who developed Irish oak dendrochronology): "The immediate conclusion is that it is impossible to sensibly resolve the radiocarbon dates of any samples whose true ages lie between 400 and 800 BC.  This is a catastrophe for Late Bronze Age/Iron Age archaeology although one which has been predicted for some time."

See also 
Dating methodology (archaeology)
Geologic time scale

References 

Millard, A.R. Comment on article by Blackwell and Buck https://projecteuclid.org/download/pdf_1/euclid.ba/1340370546

Radiometric dating